The 2004 Philadelphia Soul season was the inaugural season of the Philadelphia Soul in the Arena Football League. It was a disappointing season for the Soul, finishing with a record of 5–11. They won their first game on February 21 vs. the Columbus Destroyers 56–34.

Schedule

External links
2004 Schedule at arenafan.com

Philadelphia Soul Season, 2004
Philadelphia Soul seasons
2004 in sports in Pennsylvania